

The Pingat Keberanian (English: Medal of Valour) is a Singaporean decoration instituted in 1987, awarded to any person who has performed an act of courage and gallantry in circumstances of personal danger.

History 
The Pingat Keberanian was instituted in 1987.

Description
 The medal is silver-gilt and consists of an eight-pointed star upon a sixteen-sided base. The obverse side bears a central disc supporting 2 crossed swords and a shield bearing a crescent and 5 stars. Below the disc is a scroll with the description "PINGAT KEBERANIAN". 
 The reverse bears the State arms.
 The ribbon is white with a red edging, a purple centre band and a purple stripe to each side of the band.

References

External links
 

Civil awards and decorations of Singapore
1987 establishments in Singapore
Awards established in 1987
Courage awards